Gymnobela eridmata is a species of sea snail, a marine gastropod mollusk in the family Raphitomidae.

Description
The length of the shell attains 25.3 mm.

Distribution
This marine species occurs in the Norfolk Ridge, New Caledonia.

References

 Sysoev, A., 1997. Mollusca Gastropoda: New deep-water turrid gastropods (Conoidea) from eastern Indonesia. Mémoires du Muséum national d'Histoire naturelle 172: 325-355
 Sysoev, A.; Bouchet, P. (2001). Gastéropodes turriformes (Gastropoda: Conoidea) nouveaux ou peu connus du Sud-Ouest Pacifique = New and uncommon turriform gastropods (Gastropoda: Conoidea) from the South-West Pacific. in: Bouchet, P. et al. (Ed.) Tropical deep-sea benthos. Mémoires du Muséum national d'Histoire naturelle. Série A, Zoologie. 185: 271-320.

External links
 MNHN, Paris: holotype
 
 Gastropods.com: Gymnobela eridmata

eridmata
Gastropods described in 2001